Universal design is the design of buildings, products or environments to make them accessible to people, regardless of age, disability or other factors.  It addresses common barriers to participation by creating things that can be used by the maximum number of people possible.  Curb cuts or sidewalk ramps, which are essential for people in wheelchairs but also used by all, are a common example of universal design. 

The term universal design was coined by the architect Ronald Mace to describe the concept of designing all products and the built environment to be aesthetic and usable to the greatest extent possible by everyone, regardless of their age, ability, or status in life.  However, due to some people having unusual or conflicting access needs, such as a person with low vision needing bright light and a person with photophobia needing dim light, universal design does not address absolutely every need for every person in every situation. 

Universal design emerged from slightly earlier barrier-free concepts, the broader accessibility movement, and adaptive and assistive technology and also seeks to blend aesthetics into these core considerations. As life expectancy rises and modern medicine increases the survival rate of those with significant injuries, illnesses, and birth defects, there is a growing interest in universal design. There are many industries in which universal design is having strong market penetration but there are many others in which it has not yet been adopted to any great extent. Universal design is also being applied to the design of technology, instruction, services, and other products and environments.

However, it was the work of Selwyn Goldsmith, author of Designing for the Disabled (1963), who really pioneered the concept of free access for people with disabilities. His most significant achievement was the creation of the dropped curb – now a standard feature of the built environment.

Principles
The Center for Universal Design at North Carolina State University expounded the following principles:

 Equitable use
 Flexibility in use
 Simple and intuitive
 Perceptible information
 Tolerance for error
 Low physical effort
 Size and space for approach and use

Each principle above is succinctly defined and contains a few brief guidelines that can be applied to design processes in any realm: physical or digital.

These principles are broader than those of accessible design and barrier-free design.

Goals
In 2012, the Center for Inclusive Design and Environmental Access at the University at Buffalo expanded the definition of the principles of universal design to include social participation and health and wellness. Rooted in evidence based design, the 8 goals of universal design were also developed.

 Body Fit
 Comfort
 Awareness
 Understanding
 Wellness
 Social Integration
 Personalization
 Cultural Appropriateness

The first four goals are oriented to human performance: anthropometry, biomechanics, perception, cognition. Wellness bridges human performance and social participation. The last three goals addresses social participation outcomes. The definition and the goals are expanded upon in the textbook "Universal Design: Creating Inclusive Environments."

Examples
Color-contrast dishware with steep sides that assists those with visual or dexterity problems are an example of universal design.  Anyone can use the dishes, and more people can use this than a flat plate.

There are also cabinets with pull-out shelves, kitchen counters at several heights to accommodate different tasks and postures.  In many of the world's public transit systems, low-floor buses that "kneel" (bring their front end to ground level to eliminate gap) and/or are equipped with ramps rather than on-board lifts.
 Smooth, ground level entrances without stairs
 Surface textures that require low force to traverse on level, less than 5 pounds force per 120 pounds rolling force
 Surfaces that are stable, firm, and slip resistant per ASTM 2047
 Wide interior doors (3'0"), hallways, and alcoves with 60" × 60" turning space at doors and dead-ends
 Functional clearances for approach and use of elements and components
 Lever handles for opening doors rather than twisting knobs
 Single-hand operation with closed fist for operable components including fire alarm pull stations
 Components that do not require tight grasping, pinching or twisting of the wrist
 Components that require less than 5 pounds of force to operate
 Cash
 Light switches with large flat panels rather than small toggle switches
 Buttons and other controls that can be distinguished by touch
 Bright and appropriate lighting, particularly task lighting
 Auditory output redundant with information on visual displays
 Visual output redundant with information in auditory output
 Contrast controls on visual output
 Use of meaningful icons with text labels
 Clear lines of sight to reduce dependence on sound
 Volume controls on auditory output
 Speed controls on auditory output
 Choice of language on speech output
 Ramp access in swimming pools
 Closed captioning on television networks
 Signs with light-on-dark visual contrast
 Web pages that provide alternative text to describe images
 Instruction that presents material both orally and visually
 Labels in large print on equipment control buttons
 A museum that allows visitors to choose to listen to or read descriptions

Design standards
In 1960, specifications for barrier-free design were published. It was a compendium of over 11 years of disability ergonomic research. In 1961, the specifications became the first Barrier Free Design standard called the American National Standard, A1171.1 was published. It was the first standard to present the criteria for designing facilities and programs for the use of disabled individuals. The research started in 1949 at the University of Illinois Urbana-Champaign and continues to this day. The principal investigator is Dr. Timothy Nugent (his name is listed in the front of the 1961, 1971, 1980 standard). In 1949 Dr. Nugent also started the National Wheelchair Basketball Association. This ANSI A117.1 standard was adopted by the US federal government General Services Administration under 35 FR 4814 - 3/20/70, 39 FR 23214 - 6/27/74, 43 FR 16478 ABA- 4/19/78, 44 FR 39393 7/6/79, 46 FR 39436 8/3/81, in 1984 for UFAS and then in 1990 for ADA. The archived research documents are at the International Code Council (ICC) - ANSI A117.1 division. Dr. Nugent made presentations around the globe in the late 1950s and 1960s presenting the concept of independent functional participation for individuals with disabilities through program options and architectural design.

Another comprehensive publication by the Royal Institute of British Architects published three editions 1963, 1967, 1976 and 1997 of Designing for the Disabled by Selwyn Goldsmith UK. These publications contain valuable empirical data and studies of individuals with disabilities. Both standards are excellent resources for the designer and builder.

Disability ergonomics should be taught to designers, engineers, non-profits executives to further the understanding of what makes an environment wholly tenable and functional for individuals with disabilities.

In October 2003, representatives from China, Japan, and South Korea met in Beijing and agreed to set up a committee to define common design standards for a wide range of products and services that are easy to understand and use. Their goal is to publish a standard in 2004 which covers, among other areas, standards on containers and wrappings of household goods (based on a proposal from experts in Japan), and standardization of signs for public facilities, a subject which was of particular interest to China as it prepared to host the 2008 Summer Olympics.

The International Organization for Standardization, the European Committee for Electrotechnical Standardization, and the International Electrotechnical Commission have developed:
 CEN/CENELEC Guide 6 – Guidelines for standards developers to address the needs of older persons and persons with disabilities (Identical to ISO/IEC Guide 71, but free for download)
ISO 21542:2021  – Building construction — Accessibility and usability of the built environment (available in English and French)
ISO 20282-1:2006  –  Ease of operation of everyday products — Part 1: Context of use and user characteristics
ISO/TS 20282-2:2013  – Usability of consumer products and products for public use — Part 2: Summative test method, published 1 August 2013.

Design for All
The term Design for All (DfA) is used to describe a design philosophy targeting the use of products, services and systems by as many people as possible without the need for adaptation. "Design for All is design for human diversity, social inclusion and equality" (EIDD Stockholm Declaration, 2004). According to the European Commission, it "encourages manufacturers and service providers to produce new technologies for everyone: technologies that are suitable for the elderly and people with disabilities, as much as the teenage techno wizard." The origin of Design for All  lies in the field of barrier-free accessibility for people with disabilities and the broader notion of universal design.

Background
Design for All has been highlighted in Europe by the European Commission in seeking a more user-friendly society in Europe. Design for All is about ensuring that environments, products, services and interfaces work for people of all ages and abilities in different situations and under various circumstances.

Design for All has become a mainstream issue because of the aging of the population and its increasingly multi-ethnic composition. It follows a market approach and can reach out to a broader market. Easy-to-use, accessible, affordable products and services improve the quality of life of all citizens. Design for All permits access to the built environment, access to services and user-friendly products which are not just a quality factor but a necessity for many aging or disabled persons. Including Design for All early in the design process is more cost-effective than making alterations after solutions are already in the market. This is best achieved by identifying and involving users ("stakeholders") in the decision-making processes that lead to drawing up the design brief and educating public and private sector decision-makers about the benefits to be gained from making coherent use of Design (for All) in a wide range of socio-economic situations.

Examples
The following examples of Designs for All were presented in the book Diseños para todos/Designs for All published in 2008 by Optimastudio with the support of Spain's Ministry of Education, Social Affairs and Sports (IMSERSO) and CEAPAT:
 Audiobook
 Automatic door
 Electric Toothbrush
 Flexible drinking straw
 Google
 Low-floor bus
 Q-Drums
 Tactile paving
 Trolley case (roll along suitcase)
 Velcro
Other useful items for those with mobility limitations:
 Washlet
 Wireless remote controlled power sockets
 Wireless remote controlled window shades

In information and communication technology (ICT)

Design for All criteria are aimed at ensuring that everyone can participate in the Information society. The European Union refers to this under the terms eInclusion and eAccessibility. A three-way approach is proposed: goods which can be accessed by nearly all potential users without modification or, failing that, products being easy to adapt according to different needs, or using standardized interfaces that can be accessed simply by using assistive technology. To this end, manufacturers and service providers, especially, but not exclusively, in the Information and Communication Technologies (ICT), produce new technologies, products, services and applications for everyone.

European organizational networks
In Europe, people have joined in networks to promote and develop Design for All:

The European Design for All eAccessibility Network (EDeAN) was launched under the lead of the European Commission and the European Member States in 2002. It fosters Design for All for eInclusion, that is, creating an information society for all. It has national contact centres (NCCs) in almost all EU countries and more than 160 network members in national networks.
EIDD - Design for All Europe is a NGO and a 100% self-financed European organization that covers the entire area of theory and practice of Design for All, from the built environment and tangible products to communication, service and system design. Originally set up in 1993 as the European Institute for Design and Disability (EIDD), to enhance the quality of life through Design for All, it changed its name in 2006 to bring it into line with its core business. EIDD - Design for All Europe disseminates the application of Design for All to business and administration communities previously unaware of its benefits and currently (2016) has 31 member organizations in 20 European countries.
 EuCAN - The European Concept for Accessibility Network started in 1984 as an open network of experts and advocates from all over Europe in order to promote and support the Design for All approach. The coordination work of EuCAN and the functioning of the network are mainly voluntary work. In 1999 the Luxembourg Disability Information and Meeting Centre (better known by its acronym “Info-Handicap”) took over the coordination of the steering group, together with the implicit responsibility for the follow-up of the European Concept for Accessibility (ECA). The EuCAN publications - like ECA - aim to provide practical guidance. They are neither academic nor policy documents.

The "barrier-free" concept
 building modification consists of modifying buildings or facilities so that they can be used by people who are disabled or have physical impairments. The term is used primarily in Japan and non-English speaking countries (e.g. German: Barrierefreiheit; Finnish: Esteettömyys), while in English-speaking countries, terms such as "accessibility" and "handicapped accessible" dominate in regular everyday use. An example of barrier-free design would be installing a ramp for wheelchairs alongside or in place of steps. In late 1990s any element which could make the use of the environment inconvenient was considered a barrier, for example poor public street lighting. In the case of new buildings, however, the idea of barrier free modification has largely been superseded by the concept of universal design, which seeks to design things from the outset to support easy access.

Freeing a building of barriers means:
 Recognizing the features that could form barriers for some people
 Thinking inclusively about the whole range of impairments
 Reviewing everything - from structure to smallest detail
 Seeking feedback from users and learning from mistakes

Barrier-free is also a term that applies to handicap accessibility in situations where legal codes such as the Americans with Disabilities Act of 1990 Guidelines.  The ADA is a law focusing on all building aspects, products and design that is based on the concept of respecting human rights.  It doesn't contain design specifications directly.

An example of a country that has sought to implement barrier-free accessibility in housing estates is Singapore. Within five years, all public housing estates in the country, all 7,800 blocks of apartments, have benefited from the program.

National legislation
 Chile - Ley nº 20.422, "ESTABLECE NORMAS SOBRE IGUALDAD DE OPORTUNIDADES E INCLUSIÓN SOCIAL DE PERSONAS CON DISCAPACIDAD."
 U.S. - Americans with Disabilities Act of 1990 and Section 508 Amendment to the Rehabilitation Act of 1973
 Italy - legge n. 13/1989; D.M. n. 236/1989; legge n. 104/1992; D.P.R. n. 503/1996; D.P.R. n. 380/2001 (artt. 77–82)
 Australia - Disability Discrimination Act 1992
 India - Persons with Disabilities (Equal Opportunities, Protection of Rights & Full Participation) Act, 1995
 United Kingdom - Disability Discrimination Act 1995, Disability Discrimination Act 2005 and Equality Act 2010
 Ireland - Disability Act 2005 
 France - Loi n°2005-102 du 11 février 2005 pour l'égalité des droits et des chances, la participation et la citoyenneté des personnes handicapées (Act n°2005-102 of 11 February 2005 for equality of rights and of opportunities, for participation and for citizenship of people with disabilities)
 South Korea - Prohibition of Discrimination Against Persons with Disabilities, 2008 
 Norway Discrimination and Accessibility Act of 2009   - 
 Vietnam - National Law on Persons with Disability, enacted 17 June 2010.
 Canada - Accessible Canada Act, enacted 11 July 2019.

Laws and policies related to accessibility or universal design

 Ontario, Canada 

 United States of America.

Funding agencies
The Rehabilitation Engineering Research Center (RERC) on universal design in the Built Environment funded by what is now the National Institute on Disability, Independent Living, and Rehabilitation Research completed its activities on September 29, 2021.  Twenty RERCs are currently funded.
The Center for Inclusive Design and Environmental Access at the University at Buffalo is a current recipient.

Bibliography
 Eugenio Vega (2022) Crónica del siglo de la peste. Pandemias, discapacidad y diseño. Madrid, Experimenta Libros. ISBN: 978-84-18049-73-6
 Bess Williamson (2019). Accessible America. A History of Disability and Design. New York University Press. 978-1-4798024-94

See also
 Autism friendly
 Curb cut effect
 Development plan
 Disability rights movement
 Urban planning

References

External links
 Universal Design Product Collection - a digital collection of over 200 products through our two gallery installations of the Unlimited by Design exhibition and a traveling exhibit called "live | work | eat | play." - from the University at Buffalo Libraries

Accessible building
Architectural design
Architectural theory
Design
Accessibility